The British 10,000 metres athletics champions covers three competitions; the current British Athletics Championships which was founded in 2007, the preceding AAA Championships (1880-2006) and the UK Athletics Championships which existed from 1977 until 1997 and ran concurrently with the AAA Championships.

Where an international athlete won the AAA Championships the highest ranking UK athlete is considered the National Champion in this list. Since 2018, the national 10,000m has been incorporated into the elite race at the Night of 10,000m PB event, with the same rule applying where international athletes win the race as in the AAA Championships.

Past winners

 nc = not contested
 + = UK Championships

References

10,000 metres
British
British Athletics Championships